Nikolay Marinov (born 13 August 1986) is a Bulgarian football player, who plays as a midfielder.

References

Living people
1986 births
Bulgarian footballers
Association football midfielders
OFC Sliven 2000 players
PFC Beroe Stara Zagora players
FC Sportist Svoge players
Akademik Sofia players
FC Botev Vratsa players
First Professional Football League (Bulgaria) players